Karma Cleansing is a 1997 album by the Canadian hard rock band Harem Scarem. The album was released as Believe in Japan with the songs "Cages" and "The Mirror" being replaced with "Staying Away" and "Baby with a Nail Gun". Believe was also released as a "Special Edition" featuring different versions of a few songs.

Track listings

Canadian version

Japanese version

Personnel
Band members
Harry Hess – lead vocals, guitar, producer.
Pete Lesperance – lead guitar, backing vocals, producer.
Barry Donaghy – bass, backing vocals.
Darren Smith – drums, backing vocals.

References 

1997 albums
Harem Scarem albums
Warner Music Group albums